Lucinda Devlin (born 1947) is an American photographer. Devlin lives and works in Greensboro, North Carolina.

Her mid-2000s project Field Culture documented American crop farming. In her series The Omega Suites, she documented execution chambers across the United States.

Her work is included in the collection of the Museum of Fine Arts Houston, the Whitney Museum of American Art, and the San Francisco Museum of Modern Art.

References

Living people
1947 births
20th-century American photographers
21st-century American photographers
20th-century American women artists
21st-century American women artists